Cyrus Leon Mann Jr. (April 2, 1956 – October 15, 2022) was an American professional basketball player.

Biography
He was selected by the Boston Celtics in the 4th round (72nd pick overall) of the 1975 NBA Draft. He played four years in the Philippines for the Crispa Redmanizers in the Philippine Basketball Association. In 1982, Mann staged a comeback with the Continental league champions Detroit Spirits, the 6-10 center averaged 7.8 points and 7.6 rebounds and was ranked seventh in the league in rebounding and second in blocked shots during the CBA playoffs.

Mann died from COVID-19 at Henry Ford Hospital in Detroit, at age 66.

PBA career statistics

References

1956 births
2022 deaths
American expatriate basketball people in the Philippines
Basketball players from Detroit
Boston Celtics draft picks
Centers (basketball)
Crispa Redmanizers players
Illinois State Redbirds men's basketball players
Philippine Basketball Association imports
Southeastern High School (Michigan) alumni
20th-century African-American sportspeople
African-American basketball players
American men's basketball players
Deaths from the COVID-19 pandemic in Michigan